The following is a partial list of the "C" codes for Medical Subject Headings (MeSH), as defined by the United States National Library of Medicine (NLM).

This list continues the information at List of MeSH codes (C20). Codes following these are found at List of MeSH codes (C22). For other MeSH codes, see List of MeSH codes.

The source for this content is the set of 2006 MeSH Trees from the NLM.

– disorders of environmental origin

– dna damage

– chromosome breakage

– preconception injuries

– environmental illness

– multiple chemical sensitivity

– sick building syndrome

– motion sickness

– space motion sickness

– occupational diseases

– agricultural workers' diseases
  – farmer's lung
  – silo filler's disease

– bird fancier's lung

– dermatitis, occupational

– high pressure neurological syndrome

– inert gas narcosis

– laboratory infection

– persian gulf syndrome

– pneumoconiosis
  – asbestosis
  – berylliosis
  – byssinosis
  – caplan's syndrome
  – siderosis
  – silicosis
  – anthracosilicosis
  – silicotuberculosis

– sleep disorders, circadian rhythm

– poisoning

– argyria

– arsenic poisoning

– bites and stings
  – arachnidism
  – insect bites and stings
  – snake bites
  – tick toxicoses
  – tick paralysis

– cadmium poisoning

– carbon tetrachloride poisoning

– drug toxicity
  – drug eruptions
  – epidermal necrolysis, toxic
  – erythema nodosum
  – serum sickness
  – serotonin syndrome

– ergotism

– fluoride poisoning

– food poisoning
  – botulism
  – ciguatera poisoning
  – favism
  – mushroom poisoning
  – salmonella food poisoning
  – staphylococcal food poisoning

– gas poisoning
  – carbon monoxide poisoning
  – inert gas narcosis

– hepatitis, toxic
  – hepatitis, chronic, drug-induced

– lead poisoning
  – lead poisoning, nervous system
  – lead poisoning, nervous system, adult
  – lead poisoning, nervous system, childhood

– manganese poisoning

– mercury poisoning
  – mercury poisoning, nervous system
  – acrodynia

– mycotoxicosis
  – ergotism
  – mushroom poisoning

– neurotoxicity syndromes
  – akathisia, drug-induced
  – alcohol-induced disorders, nervous system
  – alcohol amnestic disorder
  – korsakoff syndrome
  – alcohol withdrawal delirium
  – alcohol withdrawal seizures
  – alcoholic neuropathy
  – dyskinesia, drug-induced
  – mptp poisoning
  – neuroleptic malignant syndrome

– overdose

– plant poisoning
  – ergotism
  – favism
  – lathyrism
  – milk sickness

– psychoses, substance-induced
  – psychoses, alcoholic

– water intoxication

– preconception injuries

– substance-related disorders

– alcohol-related disorders
  – alcohol-induced disorders
  – alcohol-induced disorders, nervous system
  – alcohol amnestic disorder
  – korsakoff syndrome
  – alcohol withdrawal delirium
  – alcohol withdrawal seizures
  – alcoholic neuropathy
  – cardiomyopathy, alcoholic
  – fetal alcohol syndrome
  – liver diseases, alcoholic
  – fatty liver, alcoholic
  – hepatitis, alcoholic
  – liver cirrhosis, alcoholic
  – pancreatitis, alcoholic
  – psychoses, alcoholic
  – alcoholic intoxication
  – alcoholism
  – wernicke encephalopathy

– amphetamine-related disorders

– cocaine-related disorders

– marijuana abuse

– neonatal abstinence syndrome

– opioid-related disorders
  – heroin dependence
  – morphine dependence

– phencyclidine abuse

– psychoses, substance-induced

– substance abuse, intravenous

– substance withdrawal syndrome
  – alcohol withdrawal delirium
  – alcohol withdrawal seizures

– tobacco use disorder

– wounds and injuries

– abdominal injuries
  – hernia, diaphragmatic, traumatic
  – splenic rupture
  – splenosis
  – stomach rupture

– amputation, traumatic

– arm injuries
  – forearm injuries
  – radius fractures
  – ulna fractures
  – humeral fractures
  – shoulder dislocation
  – shoulder fractures
  – tennis elbow
  – wrist injuries

– asphyxia

– athletic injuries

– back injuries
  – spinal injuries
  – spinal fractures

– barotrauma
  – blast injuries
  – decompression sickness

– birth injuries
  – paralysis, obstetric

– bites and stings
  – bites, human

– burns
  – burns, chemical
  – burns, electric
  – burns, inhalation
  – smoke inhalation injury
  – eye burns
  – sunburn

– contusions

– craniocerebral trauma
  – brain injuries
  – brain concussion
  – post-concussion syndrome
  – brain hemorrhage, traumatic
  – brain stem hemorrhage, traumatic
  – cerebral hemorrhage, traumatic
  – brain injury, chronic
  – diffuse axonal injury
  – epilepsy, post-traumatic
  – pneumocephalus
  – shaken baby syndrome
  – cerebrospinal fluid otorrhea
  – cerebrospinal fluid rhinorrhea
  – coma, post-head injury
  – cranial nerve injuries
  – abducens nerve injury
  – facial nerve injuries
  – optic nerve injuries
  – facial injuries
  – eye injuries
  – eye burns
  – eye foreign bodies
  – eye injuries, penetrating
  – maxillofacial injuries
  – jaw fractures
  – mandibular fractures
  – maxillary fractures
  – mandibular injuries
  – orbital fractures
  – zygomatic fractures
  – head injuries, closed
  – head injuries, penetrating
  – intracranial hemorrhage, traumatic
  – hematoma, epidural, cranial
  – hematoma, subdural
  – hematoma, subdural, acute
  – hematoma, subdural, chronic
  – hematoma, subdural, intracranial
  – subarachnoid hemorrhage, traumatic
  – skull fractures
  – skull fracture, basilar
  – skull fracture, depressed

– dislocations
  – hip dislocation
  – knee dislocation
  – patellar dislocation
  – pubic symphysis diastasis
  – shoulder dislocation

– drowning
  – near drowning

– electric injuries
  – burns, electric
  – lightning injuries

– esophageal perforation

– extravasation of diagnostic and therapeutic materials

– foreign bodies
  – bezoars
  – eye foreign bodies
  – foreign-body migration
  – foreign-body reaction
  – granuloma, foreign-body

– fractures, bone
  – femoral fractures
  – hip fractures
  – femoral neck fractures
  – fractures, closed
  – fractures, comminuted
  – fractures, compression
  – fractures, malunited
  – fractures, open
  – fractures, spontaneous
  – fractures, stress
  – fractures, ununited
  – pseudarthrosis
  – hip fractures
  – humeral fractures
  – radius fractures
  – colles' fracture
  – rib fractures
  – shoulder fractures
  – skull fractures
  – jaw fractures
  – mandibular fractures
  – maxillary fractures
  – orbital fractures
  – skull fracture, basilar
  – skull fracture, depressed
  – zygomatic fractures
  – spinal fractures
  – tibial fractures
  – ulna fractures
  – monteggia's fracture

– fractures, cartilage

– frostbite
  – chilblains

– hand injuries
  – finger injuries

– heat stress disorders
  – heat exhaustion
  – sunstroke
  – heat stroke

– hip injuries
  – hip dislocation
  – hip fractures

– lacerations

– leg injuries
  – ankle injuries
  – femoral fractures
  – hip fractures
  – femoral neck fractures
  – foot injuries
  – knee injuries
  – knee dislocation
  – patellar dislocation
  – tibial fractures

– multiple trauma

– neck injuries
  – whiplash injuries

– radiation injuries
  – abnormalities, radiation-induced
  – leukemia, radiation-induced
  – neoplasms, radiation-induced
  – osteoradionecrosis
  – radiation injuries, experimental
  – radiation pneumonitis
  – radiodermatitis

– retropneumoperitoneum

– rupture
  – aortic rupture
  – splenic rupture
  – splenosis
  – stomach rupture
  – uterine rupture
  – uterine perforation

– self mutilation

– shock, traumatic
  – crush syndrome

– soft tissue injuries

– spinal cord injuries
  – central cord syndrome
  – spinal cord compression

– spinal injuries
  – spinal fractures

– sprains and strains
  – cumulative trauma disorders
  – carpal tunnel syndrome
  – ulnar nerve compression syndromes
  – cubital tunnel syndrome

– tendon injuries
  – tendinopathy

– thoracic injuries
  – flail chest
  – heart injuries
  – rib fractures

– tooth injuries
  – tooth avulsion
  – tooth fractures
  – cracked tooth syndrome

– trauma, nervous system
  – cerebrovascular trauma
  – carotid artery injuries
  – carotid artery, internal, dissection
  – carotid-cavernous sinus fistula
  – vertebral artery dissection
  – craniocerebral trauma
  – brain injuries
  – brain concussion
  – post-concussion syndrome
  – brain hemorrhage, traumatic
  – brain stem hemorrhage, traumatic
  – cerebral hemorrhage, traumatic
  – brain injury, chronic
  – diffuse axonal injury
  – epilepsy, post-traumatic
  – pneumocephalus
  – shaken baby syndrome
  – cerebrospinal fluid otorrhea
  – cerebrospinal fluid rhinorrhea
  – coma, post-head injury
  – cranial nerve injuries
  – abducens nerve injury
  – facial nerve injuries
  – optic nerve injuries
  – head injuries, closed
  – head injuries, penetrating
  – intracranial hemorrhage, traumatic
  – brain hemorrhage, traumatic
  – brain stem hemorrhage, traumatic
  – cerebral hemorrhage, traumatic
  – hematoma, epidural, cranial
  – hematoma, subdural
  – hematoma, subdural, acute
  – hematoma, subdural, chronic
  – hematoma, subdural, intracranial
  – subarachnoid hemorrhage, traumatic
  – skull fractures
  – skull fracture, basilar
  – skull fracture, depressed

– tympanic membrane perforation

– wound infection

– wounds, nonpenetrating
  – brain concussion
  – post-concussion syndrome
  – contusions
  – head injuries, closed
  – brain concussion
  – post-concussion syndrome

– wounds, penetrating
  – decapitation
  – eye injuries, penetrating
  – head injuries, penetrating
  – wounds, gunshot
  – wounds, stab
  – needlestick injuries

The list continues at List of MeSH codes (C22).

C21